The 1955 Critérium du Dauphiné Libéré was the 9th edition of the cycle race and was held from 11 June to 19 June 1955. The race started in Valence and finished at Grenoble. The race was won by Louison Bobet of the Mercier team.

General classification

References

1955
1955 in French sport
June 1955 sports events in Europe